Darren Tarczon (born 28 February 1971) is a former Australian rules footballer who played with Carlton in the Australian Football League (AFL).

Notes

External links

Darren Tarczon's profile at Blueseum

1971 births
Australian rules footballers from Victoria (Australia)
Carlton Football Club players
Port Melbourne Football Club players
Living people